Paracetopsis esmeraldas is a species of whale catfish endemic to Ecuador where it occurs in the Pacific drainages of the northwest.  This species grows to a length of 18.8 cm (7.4 inches).

References 
 

Cetopsidae
Fish described in 2005
Fish of South America
Freshwater fish of Ecuador